El Adon or El Adon al kol ha-ma'asim ( or , English: God is the Lord or God is the Lord of all creation) is a well-known Jewish liturgical poem, a so-called piyyut that was probably written in the Land of Israel during the Middle Ages but could be as old as the 2nd century, making it possibly one of the oldest Jewish prayers in continuous use. Like many other liturgical poems, it is written without rhyme and as an alphabetical poem - meaning that the first line starts with the first letter of the Hebrew alphabet, the second line starts with the second letter thereof, and so on.

Text
Text below is Nusach Sefard; Nusach Ashkenaz wording differs slightly.  The first Hebrew letter of each line is made bold as to indicate the alphabetical nature of the poem.

References

Jewish liturgical poems